Land art, variously known as Earth art, environmental art, and Earthworks, is an art movement that emerged in the 1960s and 1970s, largely associated with Great Britain and the United States but that also includes examples from many countries. As a trend, "land art" expanded boundaries of art by the materials used and the siting of the works. The materials used were often the materials of the Earth, including the soil, rocks, vegetation, and water found on-site, and the sites of the works were often distant from population centers. Though sometimes fairly inaccessible, photo documentation was commonly brought back to the urban art gallery.

Concerns of the art movement centered around rejection of the commercialization of art-making and enthusiasm with an emergent ecological movement. The art movement coincided with the popularity of the rejection of urban living and its counterpart, an enthusiasm for that which is rural. Included in these inclinations were spiritual yearnings concerning the planet Earth as home to humanity.

Form

 

In the 1960s and 1970s land art protested "ruthless commercialization" of art in America. During this period, exponents of land art rejected the museum or gallery as the setting of artistic activity and developed monumental landscape projects which were beyond the reach of traditional transportable sculpture and the commercial art market, although photographic documentation was often presented in normal gallery spaces. Land art was inspired by minimal art and conceptual art but also by modern movements such as De Stijl, Cubism, minimalism and the work of Constantin Brâncuși and Joseph Beuys. Many of the artists associated with land art had been involved with minimal art and conceptual art. Isamu Noguchi's 1941 design for Contoured Playground in New York City is sometimes interpreted as an important early piece of land art even though the artist himself never called his work "land art" but simply "sculpture". His influence on contemporary land art, landscape architecture and environmental sculpture is evident in many works today.

Alan Sonfist used an alternative approach to working with nature and culture by bringing historical nature and sustainable art back into New York City. His most inspirational work is Time Landscape, an indigenous forest he planted in New York City. He also created several other Time Landscapes around the world such as Circles of Time in Florence, Italy documenting the historical usage of the land, and recently at the deCordova Sculpture Park and Museum outside Boston. According to critic Barbara Rose, writing in Artforum in 1969, he had become disillusioned with the commodification and insularity of gallery bound art. In 1967, the art critic Grace Glueck writing in The New York Times declared the first Earthwork to be done by Douglas Leichter and Richard Saba at the Skowhegan School of Painting and Sculpture. The sudden appearance of land art in 1968 can be located as a response by a generation of artists mostly in their late twenties to the heightened political activism of the year and the emerging environmental and women's liberation movements.

One example of land art in the 20th century was a group exhibition called "Earthworks" created in 1968 at the Dwan Gallery  in New York. In February 1969, Willoughby Sharp curated the "Earth Art" exhibition at the Andrew Dickson White Museum of Art at Cornell University, Ithaca, New York. The artists included were Walter De Maria, Jan Dibbets, Hans Haacke, Michael Heizer, Neil Jenney, Richard Long, David Medalla, Robert Morris, Dennis Oppenheim, Robert Smithson, and Gunther Uecker. The exhibition was directed by Thomas W. Leavitt. Gordon Matta-Clark, who lived in Ithaca at the time, was invited by Sharp to help the artists in "Earth Art" with the on-site execution of their works for the exhibition.

Perhaps the best known artist who worked in this genre was Robert Smithson whose 1968 essay "The Sedimentation of the Mind: Earth Projects" provided a critical framework for the movement as a reaction to the disengagement of Modernism from social issues as represented by the critic Clement Greenberg. His best known piece, and probably the most famous piece of all land art, is the Spiral Jetty (1970), for which Smithson arranged rock, earth and algae so as to form a long (1500 ft) spiral-shape jetty protruding into Great Salt Lake in northern Utah, U.S. How much of the work, if any, is visible is dependent on the fluctuating water levels. Since its creation, the work has been completely covered, and then uncovered again, by water. A steward of the artwork in conjunction with the Dia Foundation, the Utah Museum of Fine Arts regularly curates programming around the Spiral Jetty, including a "Family Backpacks" program. Smithson's Gravel Mirror with Cracks and Dust (1968) is an example of land art existing in a gallery space rather than in the natural environment. It consists of a pile of gravel by the side of a partially mirrored gallery wall. In its simplicity of form and concentration on the materials themselves, this and other pieces of land art have an affinity with minimalism. There is also a relationship to Arte Povera in the use of materials traditionally considered "unartistic" or "worthless". The Italian Germano Celant, founder of Arte Povera, was one of the first curators to promote land art.

"Land artists" have tended to be American, with other prominent artists in this field being Carl Andre, Alice Aycock, Walter De Maria, Hans Haacke, Michael Heizer, Nancy Holt, Peter Hutchinson, Ana Mendieta, Dennis Oppenheim, Andrew Rogers, Charles Ross, Alan Sonfist, and James Turrell. Turrell began work in 1972 on possibly the largest piece of land art thus far, reshaping the earth surrounding the extinct Roden Crater volcano in Arizona. Perhaps the most prominent non-American land artists are the British Chris Drury, Andy Goldsworthy, Richard Long and the Australian Andrew Rogers.
In 1973 Jacek Tylicki begins to lay out blank canvases or paper sheets in the natural environment for the nature to create art.

Some projects by the artists Christo and Jeanne-Claude (who are famous for wrapping monuments, buildings and landscapes in fabric) have also been considered land art by some, though the artists themselves consider this incorrect. Joseph Beuys's concept of "social sculpture" influenced "land art", and his *7000 Eichen* project of 1982 to plant 7,000 Oak trees has many similarities to land art processes. Rogers' “Rhythms of Life” project is the largest contemporary land-art undertaking in the world, forming a chain of stone sculptures, or geoglyphs, around the globe – 12 sites – in disparate exotic locations (from below sea level and up to altitudes of 4,300 m/14,107 ft). Up to three geoglyphs (ranging in size up to 40,000 sq m/430,560 sq ft) are located in each site.

Land artists in America relied mostly on wealthy patrons and private foundations to fund their often costly projects. With the sudden economic downturn of the mid-1970s, funds from these sources largely stopped. With the death of Robert Smithson in a plane crash in 1973, the movement lost one of its most important figureheads and faded out. Charles Ross continues to work on the Star Axis project, which he began in 1971. Michael Heizer in 2022 completed his work on City, and James Turrell continues to work on the Roden Crater project. In most respects, "land art" has become part of mainstream public art and in many cases the term "land art" is misused to label any kind of art in nature even though conceptually not related to the avant-garde works by the pioneers of land art.

The Earth art of the 1960s were sometimes reminiscent of the much older land works, Stonehenge, the Pyramids, Native American mounds, the Nazca Lines in Peru, Carnac stones and Native American burial grounds, and often evoked the spirituality of such archeological sites.

Contemporary land artists

 Betty Beaumont (born 1946)
 Milton Becerra (born 1951)
 Marinus Boezem (born 1934)
 Chris Booth (born 1948)
 Eberhard Bosslet (born 1953)
 Alberto Burri (1915-1995)
 Mel Chin (born 1951)
 Christo and Jeanne Claude Christo (1935-2020) Jeanne (1935-2009)
 Walter De Maria (1935-2013)
 Lucien den Arend (born 1943)
 Agnes Denes (born 1938)
 Jan Dibbets (born 1941)
 Harvey Fite (1903-1976)
 Barry Flanagan (1941-2009)
 Hamish Fulton (born 1946)
 Andy Goldsworthy (born 1956)
 Michael Heizer (born 1944)
 Nancy Holt (1938-2014)
 Peter Hutchinson (born 1930)
 Junichi Kakizaki (born 1971)
 Dani Karavan (1930–2021)
 Maya Lin (born 1959)
 Richard Long (born 1945)
 Robert Morris (1931-2018)
 Vik Muniz (born 1961)
 David Nash (born 1945)
 Ugo Rondinone (born 1964)
 Dennis Oppenheim (1938-2011)
 Georgia Papageorge (born 1941)
 Beverly Pepper (1922-2020)
 Tanya Preminger (born 1944)
 Andrew Rogers (born 1947)
 Charles Ross (born 1937)
 Richard Shilling (born 1973)
 Nobuo Sekine (1942-2019)
 Robert Smithson (1938-1973)
 Alan Sonfist (born 1946)
 James Turrell (born 1943)
 Jacek Tylicki (born 1951)
 Nils Udo (born 1937)
 Bill Vazan (born 1933)
 Strijdom van der Merwe (born 1961)

See also
Earth figures
Ecofeminist art
Ecological art
Ecovention
Environmental art
Environmental sculpture
Independent public art
Land Arts of the American West
Site-specific art
Tree Shaping

References

Notes

Further reading
 Lawrence Alloway, Wolfgang Becker, Robert Rosenblum et al., Alan Sonfist, Nature: The End of Art, Gli Ori, Dist. Thames & Hudson Florence, Italy,2004 
 Max Andrews (Ed.): Land, Art: A Cultural Ecology Handbook. London 2006 
 John Beardsley: Earthworks and Beyond. Contemporary Art in the Landscape. New York 1998 
 Suzaan Boettger, Earthworks: Art and the Landscape of the Sixties. University of California Press 2002. 
 Amy Dempsey: Destination Art. Berkeley CA 2006 
 Michel Draguet, Nils-Udo, Bob Verschueren, Bruseels: Atelier 340, 1992
Larisa Dryansky, ""Cartophotographies : de l'art conceptuel au Land Art"", Paris, éditions du Comité des travaux historiques et scientifiques-Institut national d'histoire de l'art, 2017.
 Jack Flam (Ed.). Robert Smithson: The Collected Writings, Berkeley CA 1996 
 John K. Grande: New York, London. Balance: Art and Nature, Black Rose Books, 1994, 2003  
 John K. Grande, Edward Lucie-Smith (Intro): Art Nature Dialogues: Interviews with Environmental Artists, New York 2004 
 John K. Grande, David Peat & Edward Lucie-Smith (Introduction & forward) Dialogues in Diversity, Italy: Pari Publishing, 2007, 
Eleanor Heartney, Andrew Rogers Geoglyphs, Rhythms of Life, Edizioni Charta srl, Italy, 2009 
 Robert Hobbs, Robert Smithson: A Retrospective View, Wilhelm Lehmbruck Museum, Duisburg / Herbert F. Johnson Museum of Art, Cornell University,
 Jeffrey Kastner, Brian Wallis: Land and Environmental Art. Boston 1998 
 Lucy R Lippard: Overlay: Contemporary Art and the Art of Prehistory. New York 1983 
Alessandro Rocca: Natural Architecture. New York (2007) 
Chris Taylor and Bill Gilbert. Land Arts of the American West. Austin: University of Texas Press; 2009. 
 Gilles A. Tiberghien: Land Art. Ed. Carré 1993/1995/2012
 Udo Weilacher: Between Landscape Architecture and Land Art. Basel Berlin Boston 1999

External links

 Artist in Nature International Network
 Denarend.com - About land art
 Land Arts of the American West
 Official UNM Land Arts of the American West Program Website
 Roden Crater by James Turrell
 Broken Circle
 OBSART | Observatoire du Land Art
  Using land art as a form of advertising
 Center for Land Use Interpretation entry for Land Art
 The Case for Land Art | The Art Assignment | PBS

 
Contemporary art movements
Installation art
Art
Environmental design